Marcus Wilson Acheson (June 7, 1828 – June 21, 1906), frequently known as M. W. Acheson, was a United States circuit judge of the United States Court of Appeals for the Third Circuit and of the United States Circuit Courts for the Third Circuit and previously was a United States district judge of the United States District Court for the Western District of Pennsylvania.

Family

Acheson was born on June 7, 1828, in Washington, Pennsylvania, son of David and Mary (Wilson) Acheson.

He was married to Sophie Reiter on June 9, 1859.

Education and career

Acheson received a Bachelor of Arts degree in 1845 from Washington College (now Washington & Jefferson College) and read law in 1852. He was in private practice in Pittsburgh, Pennsylvania from 1852 to 1880. He received the degree LL.D. from Washington and Jefferson College in 1881.

Federal judicial service

Acheson was nominated by President Rutherford B. Hayes on January 6, 1880, to a seat on the United States District Court for the Western District of Pennsylvania vacated by Judge Winthrop Welles Ketcham. He was confirmed by the United States Senate on January 14, 1880, and received his commission the same day. His service terminated on February 9, 1891, due to his elevation to the Third Circuit.

Acheson was nominated by President Benjamin Harrison on January 23, 1891, to a seat on the United States Circuit Courts for the Third Circuit vacated by Judge William McKennan. He was confirmed by the Senate on February 3, 1891, and received his commission the same day. Acheson was assigned by operation of law to additional and concurrent service on the United States Court of Appeals for the Third Circuit on June 16, 1891, to a new seat authorized by 26 Stat. 826 (Evarts Act). His service terminated on June 21, 1906, due to his death in Pittsburgh.

References

Sources
 
 Acheson's entry at Burke's Peerage and Gentry

1828 births
1906 deaths
19th-century American judges
Judges of the United States circuit courts
Judges of the United States Court of Appeals for the Third Circuit
Judges of the United States District Court for the Western District of Pennsylvania
Pennsylvania lawyers
People from Washington, Pennsylvania
United States federal judges appointed by Benjamin Harrison
United States federal judges appointed by Rutherford B. Hayes
Washington & Jefferson College alumni
United States federal judges admitted to the practice of law by reading law